S.O.S. – En segelsällskapsresa (S.O.S. - A Sailing Conduct Tour) is a Swedish comedy film which was released to cinemas in Sweden on 25 December 1988, and directed by Lasse Åberg.

Synopsis 
Lasse Åberg and Jon Skolmen star as Stig-Helmer and Ole, who end up in an archipelago with very rich people after a costume party, leading to total chaos!

Cast 
Lasse Åberg as Stig-Helmer Olsson
Jon Skolmen as Ole Bramserud
Ewa Fröling as Madde
Johan Rabaeus as Henkan
Per Eggers as Kajan
Sten Ljunggren as Didrik
Barbro Hiort af Ornäs  as Stig-Helmer's mother

References

External links 

Swedish comedy films
1980s Swedish-language films
1988 films
1988 comedy films
Competitive sailing films
Films directed by Lasse Åberg
1980s Swedish films